, is a volcanic caldera filled now with Lake Ikeda and associated with the older Ata Caldera on the Satsuma Peninsula.

Geology
The Ikeda volcano produced about 20,000 years before present the Iwamoto tephra layer found right around the region of Kagoshima Bay but not further. It later erupted Senta lava before about 7300 years ago erupting the Kikai-Akahoya tephra. In subsequent magmatic eruptions fall deposits were created of Osagari and Mizusako scoria and Ikeda pumice. The present caldera was formed 4800 years ago when the Ikeda ignimbrite erupted that reached the eastern and western sides and southern tip of the Satsuma Peninsula. The north western wall of this caldera aligns with the Onkadobira fault scarp. This was followed by later eruptions including the Ikedako tephra and those from a fissure vent line southeast of the caldera that produced the pumiceous Yamagawa base surge. A central lava dome was formed within the caldera during the late stage of these eruptions. About 2,800 years ago on part of the margin of the caldera rim the andesitic  Nabeshimadake lava dome was formed.

Ikeda Caldera is associated in the Ibusuki volcanic field with the more recently active Kaimondake stratovolcano. The National Catalogue of the Active Volcanoes of Japan (JMA, 2013) includes features of the Ibusuki volcanic field as part of the Ata post-caldera system.

References

Volcanoes of Kyushu
VEI-5 volcanoes
Calderas of Kyushu
Pleistocene calderas
Active volcanoes
Volcanoes of Kagoshima Prefecture
Paleolithic Japan